Felipe is the Spanish variant of the name Philip, which derives from the Greek adjective Philippos "friend of horses". Felipe is also widely used in Portuguese-speaking Brazil alongside Filipe, the form commonly used in Portugal.

Noteworthy people with this name include:

Politics
 Felipe Calderón, former President of Mexico 
 Felipe I of Spain
 Felipe II of Spain
 Felipe III of Spain
 Felipe IV of Spain
 Felipe V of Spain
 Felipe VI of Spain, King of Spain
 Felipe de Marichalar y Borbón, nephew of the Spanish king
 Felipe Herrera, Chilean economist
 FELIPE may refer to the Popular Liberation Front in Spain

Sports
 Felipe Paulino (born 1983), Dominican-Venezuelan baseball pitcher
 Felipe Alou (born 1935), Dominican baseball player and manager
 Felipe Contepomi (born 1977), Argentine rugby union player
 Felipe Drugovich (born 2000), Brazilian racing driver
 Felipe Franco, Brazilian water polo player
 Felipe Kitadai (born 1989), Brazilian Olympic medalist judoka
 Felipe Massa (born 1981), Brazilian Formula E driver
 Felipe Muñoz, Mexican breaststroke swimmer
 Felipe Nasr, Brazilian former Formula One driver
 Felipe Reyes, Spanish basketball player
 Felipe Vázquez, Venezuelan baseball player
 Felipe Santos (disambiguation), multiple sportsmen
Football
 Felipe Miñambres, Spanish footballer
 Luiz Felipe Scolari, Brazilian football manager
 Felipe (footballer, born 1989) (Felipe Augusto de Almeida Monteiro), Brazilian footballer
 Felipe Melo, Brazilian footballer
 Felipe Campos (Brazilian footballer), Brazilian footballer
 Felipe Félix, Brazilian footballer
 Felipe Fumaça (born 1993), known as Felipe, Brazilian footballer 
 Felipe Mattioni (born 1988), Brazilian footballer
 Felipe (footballer, born February 1984) (Luiz Felipe Ventura dos Santos), Brazilian footballer
 Felipe (footballer, born 1977), Brazilian footballer
 Felipe (footballer, born 1978), Brazilian footballer
 Felipe (footballer, born 1988), Brazilian footballer
 Felipe (footballer, born 1992), Brazilian footballer
 Felipe (footballer, born 1994), Brazilian footballer
 Felipe (footballer, born 2000), Brazilian footballer
 Felipe Albuquerque, Brazilian footballer
 Felipe Martins (footballer, born September 1990) (born 1990), commonly known as Felipe, Brazilian footballer
 Felipe (footballer, born July 1984) (Felipe Dias da Silva dal Belo), Brazilian footballer
 Filipe Luís, Brazilian footballer
 Felipe Peralta (born 1962), Paraguayan footballer
 Felipe Caicedo, Ecuadorian footballer
 Felipe Guréndez (born 1975), known as Felipe, Spanish footballer

Fictional
Felipe, a hostile scarlet macaw who is the leader of his own tribe in Rio 2
Felipe Gómez, a character on the American television sitcom Three's Company
Felipe, a screwdriver in Handy Manny

Miscellaneous
 Convento de San Felipe el Real (Madrid)
 Felipe Espinosa (1836–1863), Mexican-American murderer
 Felipe López (disambiguation)
 Felipe (or Felipillo), a native Peruvian who accompanied Francisco Pizarro and Diego de Almagro on their various expeditions to Peru as an interpreter

Portuguese masculine given names
Spanish masculine given names